Vigário Geral is a neighborhood in the North Zone of Rio de Janeiro with a large favela.

It is infamous for the Vigário Geral massacre that occurred here in 1993.

Popular culture
The movie Favela Rising follows the development of the Afro Reggae in this neighborhood, as well as focusing on life there.

Favelas
Neighbourhoods in Rio de Janeiro (city)